André Rolet (5 August 1901 – 11 February 1989) was a French strongman and weightlifter. He competed in the men's light-heavyweight event at the 1924 Summer Olympics.

Rolet came third in the "Most Beautiful Athlete in Europe" competition.

References

External links
 

1901 births
1989 deaths
French male weightlifters
French strength athletes
Olympic weightlifters of France
People associated with physical culture
Weightlifters at the 1924 Summer Olympics
Place of birth missing
20th-century French people